Elevation Church is a Baptist Evangelical multi-site megachurch pastored by Steven Furtick, based in Charlotte, North Carolina. It is affiliated with the Southern Baptist Convention. Weekly church attendance was 27,408 people in 2021. Elevation has 20 locations.

History
The church began as a church plant of the Baptist State Convention of North Carolina, with Steven Furtick and seven other families from Christ Covenant Church in Shelby, North Carolina, relocated to Charlotte, North Carolina, meeting in Providence High School. On February 5, 2006, the first Sunday worship service, 121 people attended. By 2013, the church's regular attendance had grown to nearly 15,000 people weekly. According to a 2018 church census, it claimed a weekly attendance of 25,317 people and 16 campuses in different cities. As of 2022, Elevation averages 26,000 attendees, with an additional 65,000 attending on their online platform called eFam.

Beliefs 
The Church has a Baptist confession of faith and is a member of the Southern Baptist Convention. The Church believes the Bible to be inerrant.

Outreach
Since 2006, Elevation Church has given more than $10 million. In 2011, a partnership with Charlotte Mayor Anthony Foxx was established to give 100,000 hours and $750,000 to serve Charlotte people in "The Orange Initiative." In 2012, the church completed The Orange Initiative with over 102,000 hours served.

In 2008, Elevation Church gave out $40,000 to members, in envelopes filled with $5, $20, even $1,000, and told them to spend it kindly on others.

In 2012, Elevation Church launched an initiative calling for members to mentor children for the 2012–2013 school year, with over 1,600 responding. The school outreach program was criticized in local LGBT media.

In 2020, Elevation Church partnered with NASCAR driver Joey Logano through his foundation to establish a $1 million COVID-19 Response and Recovery Fund. Elevation also collaborated with the Food Bank of Central and Eastern North Carolina, giving away 17,000 meals to people in need during the COVID-19 pandemic.

Love week 
Since 2010, Elevation Church has hosted a week-long outreach called "Love Week." During the church's 2010 "Love Week," Elevation members packed more than 10,000 sandwiches for the homeless, helped single mothers get their cars serviced, donated blood, cleaned up parks and streets, built a soccer field for local ministries and renovated buildings. In 2011, Elevation and over 25 other local churches served more than 34,000 hours in a single week. In 2012, Elevation partnered with 31 other churches to serve 62 outreach organizations for a total of 50,340 hours around the city of Charlotte, N.C. Elevation also partnered with Presbyterian Hospital-Matthews to help fund enhancements and expansion at a local free clinic. During Elevation's 2021 Love Week, the church had 22,651 volunteers help for a total of 47,465 hours, serving 314 organizations with 1,588 total events. Elevation Church donated 1.6 million to outreach partners, while the volunteers made 2,200 baby care kits, 5,600 dignity kits for women and teens, 21,000 backpacks for students, and distributed 30,900 snack packs.

Public image 

In 2014, Elevation Church has been criticized over its practice of selecting volunteers who wish to be baptized to do so during so-called "spontaneous baptism" services. In response to the initial coverage, Elevation released a statement, which reads in part: "We are confident that those who attend Elevation Church know and understand our mission and vision for reaching people for Jesus Christ. As attendees, they are provided, through weekly teachings, biblical context for everything we do and practice, such as baptism, giving, serving and inviting friends to church."

See also

List of the largest evangelical churches
List of the largest evangelical church auditoriums
Worship service (evangelicalism)

References

External links
Official website
Elevation Network website

Evangelical megachurches in the United States
Megachurches in North Carolina
Christian organizations established in 2006
Southern Baptist Convention churches
Evangelical churches in Charlotte, North Carolina
Baptist churches in North Carolina
21st-century Baptist churches in the United States
Baptist multisite churches